FK Spišská Nová Ves is a Slovak association football team, based in the town of Spišská Nová Ves. The club was founded in 1914.

Previous names
 1914 - ISE Igló - (Iglói Sport Egyesület) (Hungarian) (1914)
 ŠK Tatran Spišská Nová Ves (1919)
 AC (Atletický club Spišská Nová Ves) (1922)
 Sokol Spišská Nová Ves (1948)
 TJ Sokol Lokomotíva Spišská Nová Ves (1950)
 TJ Lokomotíva Spišská Nová Ves (1953)
 TJ Lokomotíva - Bane Spišská Nová Ves (1965)
 TJ AC Lokomotíva - Bane Spišská Nová Ves (1990)
 FK AC Lokomotíva - Bane Spišská Nová Ves (1993)
 MFK Lokomotíva VTJ Spišská Nová Ves (1994)
 FK VTJ Spišská Nová Ves (1998)
 FK Spišská Nová Ves (2002)
 FK NOVES Spišská Nová Ves (2017)
 FK Spišská Nová Ves (2022)

Current squad 

For recent transfers, see List of Slovak football transfers winter 2017–18.

Notable players
Had international caps for their respective countries. Players whose name is listed in bold represented their countries while playing for FK.

For full list, see :Category:FK Spišská Nová Ves players
 Ján Kozák
 František Kunzo
 Jaroslav Mihalík
 Martin Polaček
 Tomáš Suslov
 Kévin Zonzon
 Vladislav Zvara

External links 
Official website 
 

Football clubs in Slovakia
Association football clubs established in 1914
FK Spisska Nova Ves